"Don't Kill My Vibe" is the debut single by Norwegian singer and songwriter Sigrid, released on 10 February 2017 through Island Records and Universal Music Group. The song was written by Sigrid alongside Martin Sjølie, and is included on both the singer's debut EP of the same name and her debut album, Sucker Punch, serving as the lead single from each project.

Background
In an interview with NMEs Thomas Smith, Sigrid said:

Critical reception
Thomas Smith of NME stated "Katy Perry may indeed be the big pop comeback of the day—but nestled in just below her on several New Music Friday playlists across the land is an equally massive hit—and maybe even a better pop banger—from newcomer Sigrid. 'Don't Kill My Vibe' is the first single from new Island signee and it is, put simply, a belter. The 20-year-old Norwegian's entrance is a clapback at all the naysayers and under-estimators with soft, building piano and scattered beats eventually submitting to her majestic chorus." Pigeons and Planess Jacob Moore called it "an anthemic piece of pop that showcases the young singer's songwriting skills."

In other media
The song was featured in the film The American Meme and the television shows Music City, Life Sentence, Locke and Key, Love Island, The Bold Type, and Tiny Pretty Things. A Simlish version of the song appeared in the video game The Sims 4: Parenthood. A version of the song was performed by the main character Violet Valenski (portrayed by Elle Fanning) in the 2018 film Teen Spirit.

Track listing

Charts

Weekly charts

Year-end charts

Certifications

Release history

References

2017 debut singles
2017 songs
Island Records singles
Sigrid (singer) songs
Universal Music Group singles
Songs written by Martin Sjølie
Songs written by Sigrid (singer)